The Owens pupfish (Cyprinodon radiosus) is a rare species of fish in the family Cyprinodontidae, the pupfish. It is endemic to California in the United States, where it is limited to the Owens Valley. It is a federally listed endangered species of the United States. The male is blue-gray, turning bright blue during spawning. The female is greenish brown with a silvery or whitish belly.

The pupfish tolerates a wide range of water conditions. Its native habitat includes desert marshes with water temperatures up to 33 °C in the summer and layers of ice during the winter. The water in some areas has four times the salt content of the ocean, as well as low oxygen.

This fish was once common in the Owens Valley of California, occurring in most water bodies between Fish Slough and Lone Pine, which are 70 miles apart. It occurred in the Owens River and associated sloughs and marshes. At that time the Paiute people scooped them out of the water and dried them for the winter.

The diversion of water from the Owens River to the Los Angeles Metropolitan Area during the California Water Wars eliminated most of the water bodies that were the pupfish's habitat. Predation by introduced species of fish may have decimated remaining populations. By 1942 this pupfish was believed to be extinct. It was rediscovered in 1964, when one population of about 200 individuals was found. When they were transferred to a safer location, the entire global population of this pupfish was contained in two buckets. The California Department of Fish and Game established six populations in carefully managed refuge using these fish. Four of these populations remain today.

Threats to the four populations include the encroachment of cattails into the waterways. The plant clogs the habitat and collects detritus, which eliminates the pupfish's breeding substrates. The CDFG tends the four populations, clearing out the cattails. Introduced species of aquatic organisms also pose a threat. They include predatory fish such as largemouth bass (Micropterus salmoides), smallmouth bass (Micropterus dolomieu), brown trout (Salmo trutta), and bluegill (Lepomis macrochirus), as well as crayfish (Pacifastacus leniusculus) and bullfrogs (Rana catesbeiana). The severe reduction of the species into a single small population may have created a genetic bottleneck; genetic analysis is underway.

Other local Cyprinodon include Death Valley pupfish (Cyprinodon salinus salinus), Shoshone pupfish (Cyprinodon nevadensis shoshone), the extinct Tecopa pupfish (Cyprinodon nevadensis calidae), Devils Hole pupfish (Cyprinodon diabolis), and the desert pupfish (Cyprinodon macularius).

References

External links
 Terrill, C. Pister's Pupfish myurbanwild.com

Cyprinodon
Endemic fauna of California
Fauna of the Mojave Desert
Fish of the Western United States
Freshwater fish of the United States
Owens Valley
Natural history of Inyo County, California
Fish described in 1948
Taxa named by Robert Rush Miller
Endangered fauna of California
Taxonomy articles created by Polbot
ESA endangered species